Chulpan (Sulpan) is a rural locality (a village) in Tarkazinsky Selsoviet, Yermekeyevsky District, Bashkortostan, Russia. The population was 12 as of 2010. There is 1 street.

Geography 
Chulpan is located 40 km south of Yermekeyevo (the district's administrative centre) by road. Cheryomushki is the nearest rural locality.

References 

Rural localities in Yermekeyevsky District